One Life One Soul, additionally subtitled Best of Ballads, is the first compilation album released by the hard rock band Gotthard. As the title indicates, the album consists only of ballads from Gotthard's studio albums from the albums Gotthard to Homerun, along with new songs and covers.

Track listing
 Heaven (Radio Version)
 Ruby Tuesday (Rolling Stones cover)
 Looking at You (Cobra cover )
 Let it Rain
 All I Care For
 He Ain't Heavy He's My Brother (Kelly Gordon cover, popular by The Hollies)
 One Life One Soul
 You
 Home Run (Radio Version)
 Father Is That Enough
 Reason to Live
 Lonely People (Remix Version)
 Peace of Mind (New Mix Version)
 Angel
 Out On My Own
 I'm On My Way
 Love Soul Matter (New Mix Version) 
 Time (Bonus Track) (Contain hidden track - Heaven (Orchestral Version))

Personnel
Steve Lee – vocals 
Leo Leoni – guitars 
Mandy Meyer – guitars
Marc Lynn – bass guitar
Hena Habegger – drums and percussion

References

Gotthard (band) albums
2002 compilation albums